PT Bumi Resources Tbk is one of the largest mining companies in Indonesia structured as a holding company. In the 2012 Forbes Global 2000, Bumi Resources was ranked as the 1898th-largest public company in the world. It is reputedly the biggest thermal coal producer in Indonesia and is majority owned by the Bakrie Group.

History 
The company was initially established as PT Bumi Modern in 1973 and engaged in the hospitality and tourism industry. It conducted its initial public offering in 1990 and transformed its business from hospitality and tourism to oil, natural gas, and mining in 1998. The company changed its name to PT Bumi Resources Tbk in 2000.

In 2013 the organisation was beset by a host of difficulties, including the discovery of US$201 million in financial irregularities, as well as regulatory problems.

Subsidiaries 

PT Kaltim Prima Coal (KPC): operates approximately 90,000 hectares of coal mining concessions in East Kalimantan province.
PT Arutmin Indonesia: operates approximately 70,000 hectares of coal mining concessions in South Kalimantan.
PT Fajar Bumi Sakti: manages a total concession area of 8,250.5 hectares in East Kalimantan.
PT Pendopo Energi Batubara: owns a concession area of 17,840 hectares in South Sumatera.
PT Bumi Resources Minerals Tbk: operates other (non-coal) mining assets.
Kalimantan Coal Limited.
Bumi Investment Pte. Ltd.
Herald Resources Pty. Ltd.
Bumi Capital Pte. Ltd.
Indocoal Resources (Cayman) Ltd.
PT Kaltim Prima Cbm .
PT Pendopo Energi Nusantara.
PT Bumi Resources Investment.
PT MBH Minera Resources.
PT Bumi Resources Minerals.
Calipso Investment Pte. Ltd.
Forerunner International Pte. Ltd.
Enercorp Ltd.
Knightley Business Resources Pte. Ltd.
Sangatta Holdings Limited.
Bumi Holdings Sas.
PT Manaor Sihotang
PT Mitra Bisnis Harvest.
PT Sitrade Coal.
PT Seamgas Indonesia.
PT Cipta Prima Sejati.
PT Arutmin CBM.
PT Indocoal Kalsel Resources.
Enercoal Resources Pte. Ltd.
Zurich Assets International, Ltd.
PT Lumbung Capital.
PT IndoCoal Kaltim Resources.
PT Buana minera Harvest.
Bumi Netherlands B.V.
PT MBH mining Resource.
PT Arutmin Indonesia.
IndoCoal KPC Resources (Cayman) Limited.
PT Alphard Resources.
Bumi Mauritania Sa.

References

External links
 Official company site
 Kaltim Prima Coal website
 Arutmin Indonesia website
 Fajar Bumi Sakti website
 Bumi Resources Minerals website

Coal companies of Indonesia
Mining companies of Indonesia
Oil and gas companies of Indonesia
Indonesian companies established in 1973
Companies listed on the Indonesia Stock Exchange
1990 initial public offerings
Bakrie Group